Hugh Alexander Millar (April 3, 1921 – March 2, 1975) was a Canadian professional ice hockey player who played four games in the National Hockey League for the Detroit Red Wings. He was born in Edmonton, Alberta.

Career statistics

Regular season and playoffs

External links
 

1921 births
1975 deaths
Canadian expatriates in the United States
Canadian ice hockey defencemen
Detroit Red Wings players
Indianapolis Capitals players
Omaha Knights (AHA) players
Ice hockey people from Edmonton
Winnipeg Rangers players